Nations Trust Bank PLC (abbreviated as NTB) is one of the listed banks in Sri Lanka with 96 branches, 99 ATMs and 64 cash deposit & withdrawal machines as well as an automated channels and is the issuer and sole acquirer for American Express Credit Cards in Sri Lanka. Nation Trust Bank's major shareholders are John Keells Holdings and Central Finance Company PLC which are leading companies in their respective operating sectors in Sri Lanka.

History
Nations Trust Bank was established in July 1999 when it acquired the Colombo Branch of Overseas Trust Bank Ltd.

Acquisition of Waldock Mackenzie Ltd.
Acquisition of the Kandy branch of the Standard Chartered Bank
Acquisition of the Personal Banking portfolio of Deutsche Bank
Acquisition of the Commercial Banking Business and Foreign Exchange Business of American Express Bank in Colombo
Merger with Mercantile Leasing Company in January 2006

The bank has 96 branches and 99 ATM machines.

References

Banks of Sri Lanka
Banks established in 1999
Companies listed on the Colombo Stock Exchange
Sri Lankan companies established in 1999